Alfred Augustus Stockton, Ph.D, LL.D (November 2, 1842 – March 15, 1907) was a Canadian lawyer, professor, politician, and writer.

Born in Studholm, New Brunswick, the son of William Augustus Wiggins Stockton and Sarah Oldfield, Stockton received a Bachelor of Arts degree and a Master of Arts degree in 1867 from Mount Allison Wesleyan Academy (now Mount Allison University). He also received a Bachelor of Laws degree in 1869 and an LL.D in 1887 from Victoria University in Cobourg, Ontario (now Victoria University in the University of Toronto). In 1883, he received a Ph.D by examination and dissertation from Illinois Wesleyan University. He was called to the New Brunswick Bar in 1868.

From 1883 to 1899, he was a member of the Legislative Assembly of New Brunswick (for Saint John County to 1892 and Saint John City to 1899) and Leader of the Opposition from 1892 to 1899. He was elected to the House of Commons of Canada for City and County of St. John in the 1904 federal election. A Conservative. He served until his death in 1907.

References

External links
 

1842 births
1907 deaths
Conservative Party of Canada (1867–1942) MPs
Members of the House of Commons of Canada from New Brunswick
Mount Allison University alumni
Lawyers in New Brunswick
Members of the Legislative Assembly of New Brunswick
Illinois Wesleyan University alumni